The Demons of St. Petersberg is a 2008 Italian drama film directed by Giuliano Montaldo.

Cast 

 Miki Manojlović: Dostoevsky
 Carolina Crescentini: Anna
 Roberto Herlitzka: Pavlovic
 Anita Caprioli: Aleksandra
 Filippo Timi: Gusiev 
 Patrizia Sacchi: Avdotja
 Sandra Ceccarelli: Natalja Ivanovna

References

External links

2008 films
Italian drama films
Films directed by Giuliano Montaldo
Films scored by Ennio Morricone
2008 drama films
2000s Italian films